The Hall of Fame Classic powered by ShotTracker (formerly known as the College Basketball Experience Classic, Guardians Classic and the CBE Hall of Fame Classic) is an annual season-opening college basketball tournament founded in 2001. The tournament is currently held in mid-November.  There are twelve teams invited, each representing a different athletic conference.  The initial two rounds are played at regional sites on two different days hosted by participating team. The regional hosts automatically advance to the championship rounds at T-Mobile Center in Kansas City, Missouri.  The championship rounds take place one week after the initial round. Teams not hosting advance to sub regional rounds where they will play three games.  Since 2020, the event has been named the Hall of Fame Classic powered by ShotTracker.  Before the 2007 tournament, the final rounds were held at Municipal Auditorium, except for one year at Kemper Arena in 2001. The event is organized by the National Association of Basketball Coaches (NABC) and produced by Blue Ridge Sports & Entertainment, Inc.

History

Championship game results

Consolation game results

Brackets 
* – Denotes overtime period

2022

2021

2020 
All matches aired on ESPN Networks

2019

Host Rounds

Championship Round

Subhost Rounds

2018

Host Rounds

Championship Round

Subhost Rounds

2017

Host Rounds

Championship Round

Subhost Rounds

2016

Championship Round

Subhost Rounds

2015

Championship Round

Subhost Rounds

2014

External links
Official website
T-Mobile Center

References

College basketball competitions
College men's basketball competitions in the United States
Recurring sporting events established in 2001
2001 establishments in Missouri
Basketball competitions in Kansas City, Missouri
College sports tournaments in Missouri